SM U-26 was one of the 329 submarines serving in the Imperial German Navy (Kaiserliche Marine) in World War I.

U-26 was engaged in the submarine war in the Baltic Sea.  On 11 October 1914, she sank the cruiser , inflicting the first loss of the war on the Russian Navy.

Fate
The boat did not return from sea in August 1915, and is assumed to have struck a mine off the coast of Finland, being lost with its entire crew of 30.

Wreck discovered
The boat was found in the western Gulf of Finland as reported by the Finnish newspaper Helsingin Sanomat in May 2014.

Summary of raiding history

References

Notes

Citations

Bibliography

World War I submarines of Germany
Type U 23 submarines
1913 ships
Ships built in Kiel
U-boats commissioned in 1914
U-boats sunk in 1915
World War I shipwrecks in the Baltic Sea
Shipwrecks in the Gulf of Finland